Kanti Higher Secondary School (Nepali: कान्ति उच्च माध्यमिक विद्यालय )  is a government - run community school in Butwal, Nepal. It provides courses in English language. The school was established in 2010 B.S. This secondary school is affiliated with National Examination Board (NEB) and offers plus two (10+2) programs. 

The school partially rents the space for the commercial business to raise fund to run the school. The school provides scholarships to poor and needy students.

Programs 

 Ten Plus Two (+2) Humanities (+2 Humanities)
 Ten Plus Two (+2) Education (+2 Education)
 Ten Plus Two (+2) Management (+2 Management)
 Ten Plus Two (+2) Science (+2 Science)

Awards
 The school received best community school award in 2072BS amongst schools of western Nepal.

References

Schools in Nepal